Claudie Fritsch-Mentrop (born 25 December 1952), known by her stage name Desireless, is a French singer. Between 1986 and 1988, her hit single "Voyage, voyage" made it to number one on many European and Asian single charts.

According to her official website, Desireless still releases new albums and performs live, and she released a new album with Operation of the Sun (Antoine Aureche) accompanied by a worldwide tour from 2012 onward.

Discography

Albums
 François (1989) #29 France
 I Love You (1994)
 Ses plus grands succès (2003) France & (2004) Russia
 Un Brin de Paille (2004)
 More Love and Good Vibrations (2007) France & (2008) Russia
 Le Petit Bisou (2009) France
 More Love and Good Vibrations: Special Edition (2010) France
 L'Oeuf Du Dragon (2013, feat Antoine Aureche a.k.a. Operation of the Sun) France
 Noun (2014, feat Antoine Aureche a.k.a. Operation of the Sun) France
 2011-2015 (2015, 'best of' feat Antoine Aureche a.k.a. Operation of the Sun) France
 Desireless chante Apollinaire (2017, feat Antoine Aureche a.k.a. Valfeu) France

EP
 L'expérience Humaine (2011) EP
 L'Oeuf Du Dragon (2012, feat Antoine Aureche a.k.a. Operation of the Sun) - EP
 XP2 (2012) EP
 Nexus (2014, remixes & covers, feat Antoine Aureche a.k.a. Operation of the Sun) France
 Un Seul Peuple (2014) EP

Singles
From François:
 1986/87: "Voyage, voyage" (#2 France, #1 Germany, #1 Austria, #1 Belgium, #1 Denmark, #1 Spain, #1 Greece, #1 Israel, #26 Italy, #1 Lebanon,  #1 Norway, #3 Canada, #11 Netherlands, #53 United Kingdom 1987 release and #5 1988 remix release, #11 Sweden, #4 Switzerland, #1 Thailand, #1 Yugoslavia)
 1988: "John" (#5 France, #37 Germany, #92 UK)
 1989: "Qui sommes-nous?" (#41 Canada, #88 Germany)
 1990: "Elle est comme les étoiles"
From I Love You:
 1994: "Il dort"
 1994: "I Love You"
From More Love and Good Vibrations:
 2004: "La vie est belle"
 2010: "Voyage, Voyage (Dj Esteban Remix 2010)" (#81 French Club Charts)

References

External links
 

1952 births
Living people
Singers from Paris
French women singers
French dance musicians
Eurodisco musicians
CBS Records artists